Mohe Gulian Airport  is an airport serving Mohe County in Heilongjiang Province, China.  It is the northernmost airport in China and the first Chinese airport built on permafrost.  Construction started in June 2006 with a total investment of 236 million yuan, and the airport was opened in June 2008. The airport closed in July 2021 for expansion and renovation of the airport. Service resumed on 27 January 2023.

Facilities
The airport has one runway that is 2,800 meters long and 45 meters wide, and a 2,000 square-meter terminal building.  It is designed to handle 470,000 passengers annually.

Airlines and destinations

See also
List of airports in China
List of the busiest airports in China

References

Airports in Heilongjiang
Airports established in 2008
2008 establishments in China